Fanesca is a soup traditionally prepared and eaten by households and communities in Ecuador during Holy Week.

Ingredients and preparation
The components of fanesca and its method of preparation vary regionally, or even from one family to another. It is typically prepared and served only in the week before Easter (Holy Week).  It is a rich soup, with the primary ingredients being figleaf gourd (sambo), pumpkin (zapallo), and twelve different kinds of beans and grains including chochos (lupines), habas (fava beans), lentils, peas, corn and others, together with bacalao (salt cod) cooked in milk, due to the Catholic religious prohibition against red meat during Holy Week. It is also generally garnished with hard boiled eggs, fried plantains, herbs, parsley, and sometimes empanadas.

Cultural themes and consumption
The twelve beans represent the twelve apostles of Jesus, and the bacalao is symbolic of Jesus himself.

Fanesca is usually consumed at midday, which is generally the principal meal of the day within Ecuadorian culture.  The making and eating of fanesca is considered a social or family activity.

See also

 List of Ecuadorian dishes and foods
 List of foods with religious symbolism
 List of soups

External links
Fanesca recipe 
Calvin Trillin, "Speaking of soup", The New Yorker, 5 September 2005.  Trillin travels to Ecuador to experience true fanesca. Re-printed in The Best American Travel Writing 2005.

Ecuadorian soups
Easter food